Espen Aune (born 1982) is a Norwegian professional strongman competitor and winner of the 2011 Norway's Strongest Man.

Personal Records
Squat – 
Bench press – 
Deadlift –

References

Norwegian strength athletes
Living people
1982 births